David Mejia may refer to:

 David Mejia (racewalker) (born 1986), Mexican race walker
 David Mejía (footballer) (born 2003), Peruvian footballer
 David Mejia (kickboxer) (born 1995), Spanish-Colombian kickboxer